Anthony or Antony Hamilton may refer to:

Anthony Hamilton (1646–1720), Irish classical author, of aristocratic Scottish ancestry, who lived in France where he was known as Antoine Hamilton
Anthony Hamilton (Archdeacon of Colchester) (1739–1812), English priest who served as both Archdeacon of London and Archdeacon of Colchester
Anthony Hamilton-Smith, 3rd Baron Colwyn (born 1942), English peer, legislator and dental surgeon
Anthony Hamilton (born 1943), American musician and poet, of The Watts Prophets
Antony Hamilton (1952–1995), Australian actor, model and dancer
Anthony Hamilton (born 1956), Grenada-born British racing-car manager, father and former manager of Lewis Hamilton
Anthony Hamilton (athlete) (born 1969), British Paralympic athlete
Anthony Hamilton (musician) (born 1971), American R&B/soul singer-songwriter and record producer
Anthony Hamilton (snooker player) (born 1971), English snooker player
Anthony Hamilton (fighter) (born 1980), American mixed martial artist
Anthony Hamilton (soccer) (born 1985), American soccer player
Anthony Hamilton (archdeacon of Taunton) (1778–1851)

See also

Hamilton (name)